Atlas Air Flight 3591 was a scheduled domestic cargo flight under the Amazon Air banner between Miami International Airport and George Bush Intercontinental Airport in Houston. On February 23, 2019, the Boeing 767-375ER(BCF) used for this flight crashed into Trinity Bay during approach into Houston, killing the two crew members and single passenger on board. The accident occurred near Anahuac, Texas, east of Houston, shortly before 12:45 CST (18:45 UTC). This was the first fatal crash of a Boeing 767 freighter.

Investigators attributed the accident to pilot error, finding that the first officer experienced spatial disorientation and inadvertently placed the aircraft in an unrecoverable dive, while the captain failed to adequately monitor the first officer's actions and the flight path of the aircraft. Flight crew training issues at Atlas Air and across the U.S. commercial aviation industry were also implicated.

Background

Aircraft 
The Boeing 767-375ER() ( 25865/430) aircraft was registered N1217A and was nearly 27 years old at the time of the accident, having been built in 1992. It was originally ordered by Canadian Airlines, but first placed into service by China Southern Airlines through GPA, an aircraft leasing company. In 1997, it was transferred to LAN Airlines and flew for 19 years before being stored in January 2016. It was converted into a freighter in April 2017, and placed into service for Amazon Prime Air by Atlas Air. In August 2018, Amazon named two aircraft in its fleet, including N1217A as CustomAir Obsession. The name, painted on the aircraft just aft of the cockpit windows, was a near homonym of "customer obsession," an Amazon leadership principle. The aircraft had accumulated more than 91,000 hours over 23,300 flights and was powered by two GE CF6-80 turbofan engines.

Crew and passenger 
There were three people on board the aircraft: Captain Ricky Blakely of Indiana (60), first officer Conrad Jules Aska of Cedar Grove, Antigua (44), and Mesa Airlines captain Sean Archuleta of Houston (36; a jumpseater aboard the flight), who was in his final week of employment at Mesa Airlines and was traveling to work before beginning new-hire pilot training with United Airlines scheduled for the following week.

Blakely joined Atlas Air in 2015 and became a Boeing 767 captain in 2018. Before being hired by Atlas Air, Blakely had previously been an Embraer ERJ-145 captain for ExpressJet. He had also been a Beechcraft 1900 first officer for CommutAir, and a flight instructor for FlightSafety International. Blakely logged a total of 11,172 flight hours, including 1,252 hours on the Boeing 767.

Aska joined Atlas Air on July 3, 2017, and received his type rating on the Boeing 767 two months later. He had logged 5,073 flight hours, with 520 of them on the 767. Aska had previously been an Embraer E175 first officer with Mesa Airlines (and served with five other airlines prior to that) and also had experience on Embraer's EMB 120 Brasilia and ERJ aircraft families.

Both pilots had previous experience in landing at George Bush Intercontinental Airport. An Atlas Air 767 captain noted that Aska had "no real interaction with Ricky Blakely," indicating that Flight 3591 may have been the first flight in which Blakely and Aska flew together.

Accident 
Atlas Air 3591 departed Miami at 10:33 CST (11:33 EST), with Aska as the pilot flying and Blakely monitoring the controls. At 12:36, Aska transferred control of the aircraft to Blakely, telling him that the electronic flight instrument (EFI) switch on his side had malfunctioned. This issue was resolved a minute later, with the following being recorded on the cockpit voice recorder (CVR):

 Aska: "I press the Ef-y button, it fixes everything."

 Blakely: "Oh ya ya."

The pilot of another nearby airliner reported IMC, and a video taken by a ground witness showed a shelf cloud passing over the area at the time. 

First officer Aska then requested radar vectors to the west side of the airport to avoid the inclement weather. Blakely then transferred control of the aircraft back to Aska:

 Aska: "Ok. Two seven zero."

 Blakely: "Your controls."

 Aska: "My Controls."

The flight crew then started to configure the aircraft for landing and set up the flight management system (FMS). At 12:38:02.2 CST, Aska called out "flaps one”, and the slats were extended. 29 seconds later, the aircraft's go-around mode was activated. At 12:38:40.3, the following was heard on the CVR:

 Cockpit area microphone (CAM): [Sound of master caution aural warning]

Blakely (radio transmission): "sounds good uh Giant thirty-five ninety-one."

 Approach controller: "It is severe clear on the other side of this stuff so you'll have no problem gettin' the airport [unintelligible word] (either)."

 Aska: "Oh. Woah! (Where's) my speed my speed? [Spoken in elevated voice]

 CAM: [Sound similar to a mechanical click]

 Blakely (radio transmission): "Okay."

 Aska: "We're stalling! Stall!" [Exclaimed]

 Voice unidentified: "[Expletive]"

The accident aircraft made a sharp turn south before going into a rapid descent. Witnesses to the crash described the plane entering a nosedive; some also recalled hearing "what sounded like lightning" before the Boeing 767 hit the ground. 

At 12:36 CST (18:36 UTC), radar and radio contact was lost. There was no distress call. At 12:39:03.9 CST (18:39:03.9 UTC), the time the CVR recording ended, Flight 3591 crashed into the north end of Trinity Bay at Jack's Pocket. The area of water is within Chambers County, Texas, and is in proximity to Anahuac.

Air traffic controllers tried at least twice to contact the flight, with no response. Controllers asked pilots aboard two nearby flights if they saw a crash site, both of whom said they did not; the crash site was located after ground witnesses called local police to report having seen the aircraft dive into the bay. The United States Coast Guard dispatched a helicopter and several boats to search for survivors; other agencies responded as well. The local sheriff described the scene as "total devastation" and surmised that the crash had not been survivable.

Victims 
On February 24, Atlas Air confirmed that all three people on board died. The victims were first identified on social media by friends and family. By February 26 the bodies of all three had been recovered, and by March 4 all had been positively identified.

Investigation 

Investigators from the FAA, Federal Bureau of Investigation (FBI), and National Transportation Safety Board (NTSB) were dispatched to the accident site with the NTSB leading the accident investigation. A dive team from the Texas Department of Public Safety (DPS) was tasked with locating the aircraft's flight recorders and dive teams from the Houston and Baytown police departments were also on-scene assisting in the search. The CVR and flight data recorder (FDR) were located and transported to an NTSB lab for analysis. It was thought that crews would likely remain at the accident site for weeks for recovery.

It was noted that storm cells were nearby at the time of the accident, but this is not unusual for Bush Intercontinental. CCTV cameras at the Chambers County jail show the airplane in a steep, nose-low descent just prior to impact.

The FAA, Boeing, Atlas Air, National Air Traffic Controllers Association (NATCA), International Brotherhood of Teamsters (the pilots' labor union), Air Line Pilots Association, and engine maker General Electric assisted or offered their assistance to the NTSB inquiry.

After listening to the cockpit voice recorder, the NTSB stated that "Crew communications consistent with a loss of control of the aircraft began approximately 18 seconds prior to the end of the recording." On March 12, the NTSB stated that the airplane "pitched nose down over the next 18 seconds to about 49° in response to column input." Later that same day, the statement was changed to "...in response to nose-down elevator deflection."

On December 19, 2019, the NTSB released a public docket containing over 3,000 pages of factual information it had collected during the investigation, with a final report to follow at an unspecified later date. The docket contains information on "operations, survival factors, human performance, air traffic control, aircraft performance, and includes the cockpit voice recorder transcript, sound spectrum study, and the flight data recorder information."

On June 11, 2020, the NTSB announced that the next board meeting would determine the cause of the accident; 
the NTSB determined during a public board meeting held on July 14, that the flight crashed because of the first officer’s inappropriate response to an inadvertent activation of the airplane's go-around mode, resulting in his spatial disorientation that led him to place the airplane in a steep descent from which the crew did not recover. The NTSB released an animation of the mishap sequence of events from the selection of Go-Around thrust to the fatal crash 31 seconds later.

Conclusions
On August 6, 2020, the NTSB posted the final accident report to their website, which stated: 

The NTSB found that the descent had proceeded normally until the go-around mode was actuated and the aircraft's autopilot and autothrottle increased engine thrust and nose-up pitch as designed. Neither pilot verbally acknowledged that go-around mode had been actuated nor took any apparent action to deactivate it. Moments later, the first officer made nose-down flight control inputs for stall recovery, but the aircraft's stall warning systems had not actuated and FDR data was inconsistent with an aircraft in a stalled condition. The NTSB concluded that the first officer most likely struck the go-around switch accidentally with his left wrist or his wristwatch while manipulating the nearby speedbrake lever and that neither pilot realized that the aircraft's automated flight mode had been changed. During a stall, established procedures called for the pilot flying (PF) to "Hold the control column firmly", "Disengage the autopilot and autothrottle", and "Smoothly apply nose-down elevator control to reduce the AOA (angle-of-attack) until stick shaker or buffet stops". The procedures further state that the pilot monitoring (PM) (in this case the captain) to monitor and call-out changes in altitude / airspeed, call-out any trend toward terrain, and to verify all required actions are being completed. While the first officer's flight control inputs were aggressive enough to override the autopilot, investigators concluded that the captain was distracted performing other tasks and had failed to monitor the aircraft's performance.

The NTSB concluded that the aircraft was likely flying in IMC without the ground visible when the go-around mode was actuated, and the first officer most likely experienced a pitch-up or head-up somatogravic illusion, the false sensation that one is tilting backwards during unexpected forward acceleration in the absence of visible landmarks. Pilots with limited instrument flight proficiency have a well-documented tendency to disregard flight instruments and act instinctively in reaction to this illusion.

The NTSB was unable to determine why the first officer cycled the EFI switch prior to the accident; however, cycling the EFI switch in the 767 is generally done to solve intermittent display blanking and does not change the source of the data shown on the display, and the NTSB concluded that "whatever EFIS display anomaly the FO [first officer] experienced was resolved to both crewmembers' satisfaction (by the 
FO's cycling of the EFI  switch) before the events related to the accident sequence occurred."

Flight crew training issues
The NTSB noted that both pilots had difficulties in their training. Blakely experienced difficulties during training for his type rating on the 767. On October 31, 2015, he was declared unfit for a checkride due to unsatisfactory remarks on his training which included the following:

 Allowing airspeed to exceed flap limits during stall recovery training
 Forgetting to set the missed approach altitude
 Difficulties in performing missed approaches

Blakely underwent remedial training the next day on November 1, this time with satisfactory results. The day after, he had his 767 checkride, and received his type rating on the aircraft two days later. Despite Blakely's improvements, Atlas Air placed him in the pilot proficiency watch program (PWP) due to his training issues.

First officer Aska had also experienced training difficulties with Atlas Air, more so than Blakely. He had also recorded training failures with previous employers. Another Atlas Air 767 captain who had flown with Aska described him as a "nice guy" and "definitely in the top half of the people I've flown with," though he did not state any issues regarding training. Aska's first issues were reported in July 2017, the same month he joined Atlas Air, when he was declined an oral exam for his type rating on the 767 as he needed remediation training. Following the training, he passed the oral exam. Aska then went through five fixed-base (non-moving) flight simulator sessions, experiencing difficulties with normal procedures, and underwent more remediation training. In August, following two full-flight simulator training sessions, Aska's simulator partner complained that he was being "held back." Atlas Air ultimately had to restart full-flight simulator training for Aska because no other pilots remained in his training class to partner with him.

Aska's first checkride on the aircraft ended in failure due to poor crew resource management (CRM) and improper aircraft control. His examiner described him as stressed and lacking situational awareness. Aska underwent remedial training on September 25 and the next day, he reattempted his checkride successfully, receiving his type rating on the aircraft.

Investigators concluded that Aska had deliberately concealed his spotty training record when he interviewed with Atlas Air, taking advantage of shortcomings in the FAA pilot records database, which was criticized by the NTSB. A 2010 amendment to the Pilot Record Improvement Act (PRIA) passed after the 2009 crash of Colgan Air Flight 3407 required the FAA to record training failures in the database; however, this provision had not been fully implemented due to privacy concerns and industry opposition, particularly from business aviation operators who objected to the program's stringent record-keeping requirements. Atlas Air was also criticized for its reliance on agents rather than flight operations specialists to check the training backgrounds of pilots it hired.

The NTSB recommended that pilots of the 767 and the similar Boeing 757 be trained to recognize and recover from inadvertent go-around mode actuation, but also concluded that available data suggested that such an actuation was a "rare and typically benign event."

In popular culture 
The crash was featured in season 23, episode 9 of the Canadian documentary series Mayday, titled "Delivery to Disaster".

See also 
 China Airlines Flight 140 – 1994 Airbus accident involving the inadvertent actuation of go-around mode
 Delta Air Lines Flight 723
 Gulf Air Flight 072 – 2000 Airbus accident involving a sensory illusion after actuation of go-around mode

References

External links 

National Transportation Safety Board

 Air Traffic Control transmission recording
 Investigation docket
 
 
 

Other media

 Diagram of Atlas Air 767-300BCF Specifications
 
 Boeing serial no. 25865 photos at jetphotos.com
 Flight information and details at FlightAware

2019 in Texas
Accidents and incidents involving the Boeing 767
Airliner accidents and incidents caused by pilot error
Airliner accidents and incidents in Texas
Amazon (company)
Aviation accidents and incidents in the United States in 2019
Chambers County, Texas
February 2019 events in the United States